Stéphane Delplace (born 11 November 1953) is a French composer.

Biography 
Delplace was born in Bordeaux.

He studied piano under Pierre Sancan, as well as Harmony (Alain Bernaud), Counterpoint (Jean-Paul Holstein), Fugue (Michel Merlet), and Orchestration (Serge Nigg) at the Conservatoire de Paris, from 1979 to 1984, in addition to studying the Organ with Jean Galard through the Ville de Paris.

Delplace began to compose in the mid-1980s, with a firm conviction, though unpopular at the time, that tonal music still hides infinite unexplored territories.

Never parting from this ideal, his music finds its roots in that of Bach, Brahms, Fauré, Ravel, Prokofiev...

This determination to write tonal music has naturally kept him far from official contemporary music circles. 
In 2000, he joined the Phoenix Group founded by Jean-François Zygel and Thierry Escaich, in order to propose an alternative to institutionalized contemporary music.

Having explored many different types of ensembles, from orchestra to choir, from chamber music to the organ, he dedicates a large part of his opus to the piano, often played by many prestigious performers.

From 2008, he began to perform his own works in concert.  His works are played mostly in France, but also in Germany, Italy, Greece, Turkey, China, the United States...

In 2001, the Académie des Beaux-Arts awarded Delplace the prestigious Prix Florent Schmitt.

Delplace teaches Composition, Counterpoint and Harmony at the Paris Conservatories of the 6th and 17th districts, as well as at École normale de musique de Paris.

Stephane Delplace's works are edited through:  Editions Durand, Eschig, Billaudot and Delatour.

Works

Piano 
 Bach Panther (1985)
 Variations dans le Ton de Ré (1991)
 Chacone (1993)
 Préludes & Fugues dans les Trente Tonalités - Book I (1994)
 Quatorze Klavierstücke (1994-1999)
 Marche antique (1997)
 Pièces blanches - 12 pieces in C major (2000)
 Marche Funèbre (2000)
 Passacaille (2001)
 Konzerstück (2002)
 Fugue selon fugue (2006)
 Irrévérences (2006)
 Préludes & Fugues dans les Trente Tonalités - Book II (2008)
 Chronogénèse (2009)
 Six Etudes pour piano (2010)
 Little Italy (2011)

Transcriptions for piano 
 Ante Chacona - Bach, 2nd Partita for violon solo (2000)
 1ère Partita pour violon seul - Bach (2008)
 Partita pour flûte seule - Bach (2008)

Concertante 
 Adagio pour violon et orchestre à cordes (1995)
 Laus Vitæ - Symphonie concertante pour alto et violon (1998)
 Concerto pour piano n°1 (2003)
 Concerto pour piano n°2 (2005)
 Concerto à la Manière Italienne (2011)

Chamber music 
 Variations dans le ton de sol for cello solo (1992)
 Quintette à deux violoncelles (2007)
 Sextet for winds, strings and piano (2008)

Choir and organ 
 De Sibilla (1985)
 Odi et Amo (1996)

Orchestre 
 Concert pour cordes (1995)
 Le Tombeau de Ravel (1997)
 Symphonie pour cordes - Transcription of Sextet (2008)

Organ 
 Fantaisie en sol mineur (1990)
 Chacone (1993)
 Fantaisie et Fugue sur BACH - PINCEMAILLE (2007)
 Grave
 Sonate en Trio
 Fugue en ré mineur
 Non-Toccata & Fugue en fa
 Pastorale en fa (2011)

Oratorio 
 Le Plafond de la Chapelle Sixtine (2012)

Discography 
 Variations dans le ton de sol interpreted by Emmanuel Boulanger, cello - Skarbo (2005)
 Quatorze Klavierstücke interpreted by  Jean-Louis Caillard, piano - Saphir productions (2006)
 Trois Intermezzi (extract from Klavierstücke) interpreted by  Marie-Louise Nezeys, piano
 Fantaisie en sol mineur and Bach Panther interpreted by  Jean-François Frémont, organ - Disque Tamos (Jean-Claude Quint)

Leading performers

Musicians 

 Emmanuel Boulanger
 Jean-Louis Caillard
 Claudio Chaiquin
 Bertrand Chamayou
 Giancarlo Crespeau
 Denis Comtet
 Henri Demarquette

 Frédéric Denis
 Jean Dubé
 Jérôme Ducros
 Jean Galard
 Yves Henry
 Nicolas Horvath
 Sergei Malov

 Michel Michalakakos
 Jérôme Pernoo
 Pierre Pincemaille
 Grégoire Rolland
 Arnaud Thorette
 Pierre-Alain Volondat
 Jean-François Zygel

Conductor 

 Marc Korovitch
 Jean-François Frémont
 Adrian McDonnell
 Deyan Pavlov

 Laurent Petitgirard
 François-Xavier Roth
 Marc Trautmann
 Adam Vidovic

Ensembles 

 Palomar Ensemble (Chicago)
 Ensemble Millésime
 Quatuor Ebène
 Quatuor Modigliani

 Orchestre Philharmonique de Monte Carlo
 Orchestre de la Radio de Sofia
 Orchestre de la Cité Internationale
 Orchestre du Conservatoire de Luxembourg

Others 
In 2008, Stéphan Aubé directed a video clip of the Bach Panther fugue and an interview with Stéphane Delplace.

External links 
 Official Website
   Interview of Stéphane Delplace at www.pianobleu.com
   Article of Irena de la Bassetière about the Quintette à cordes
   Presentation of the Bach Panther's project
 

1953 births
Living people
Musicians from Bordeaux
Conservatoire de Paris alumni
École Normale de Musique de Paris alumni
French classical composers
French male classical composers
20th-century classical composers
21st-century classical composers
20th-century French composers
21st-century French composers
20th-century French male musicians
21st-century French male musicians